The  Budapest Wolves are an American football team from Budapest, Hungary. After establishing in 2004, in just few years the Wolves have become one of the best organized and most successful American football teams in Hungary. Today, the Wolves are competing in the Hungarian Football League.

Brief history
The Budapest Wolves were formed in 2004 by the name of Budapest American Football Club. The Wolves became one of the most successful American football teams in Hungary, have been undefeated between 2004 and 2012 under head coach Lee Hlavka, and are 7-times Hungarian Bowl champions and 8-times Hungarian champions. The Wolves also participated in Austrian lower divisions and in the Central European Football League.

Season summary

Hungarian championship 

 SF = Semi finals
 HB = Hungarian Bowl

Austrian championship 

 SF = Semi finals
 CB = Challenge Bowl
 IB = Iron Bowl

International 

 QF = Quarter finals
 SF = Semi finals
 SB = SELAF Bowl
 CB = CEFL Bowl

See also
Hungarian American Football League
Austrian Football League
Central European Football League

References

External links
 Magyarországi Amerikai Futball Csapatok Szövetsége
 American Football Bund Österreich
 Central European Football League
 Budapest Wolves Official Homepage

American football teams in Hungary
Sport in Budapest
2004 establishments in Hungary
American football teams established in 2004